Cagliari Calcio had a difficult season, where owner Massimo Cellino decided to fire three coaches during the course of the same season. Without retired Gianfranco Zola's influence of the offensive play, David Suazo took on a larger responsibility, answering with scoring 22 league goals, a career-high tally for the Honduran striker. That ensured Cagliari was kept eight points above Messina in the relegation zone. Following penalties for Juventus and Lazio in Calciopoli, the team was moved up from 16th to 14th place.

Squad

Goalkeepers
  Fabián Carini
  Andrea Campagnolo
  Antonio Chimenti

Defenders
  Joe Bizera
  Michele Canini
  Francesco Bega
  Diego López
  Michele Ferri
  Alessandro Agostini

Midfielders
  Daniele Conti
  Alessandro Conticchio
  Alessandro Budel
  Nelson Abeijón
  Claudio Pani
  Andrea Cossu
  Marco Marcuso
  Salvatore Burrai

Attackers
  Mauro Esposito
  David Suazo
  Andrea Cacco
  Andrea Capone
  Antonio Langella
  Roberto Puddu

Serie A

Matches

Top Scorers
  David Suazo 22 (5)
  Mauro Esposito 5
  Andrea Capone 3

Results summary

References

Sources
RSSSF - Italy Championship 2005/06

Cagliari Calcio seasons
Cagliari